The Georgetown International Academy is an American private international, coeducational day school in Georgetown, Guyana. Established in 1971, the academy offers an educational program compatible with the United States system from nursery through grade 12.

The school year comprises two semesters extending approximately from the end of August to the end of January and from the end of January to the middle of June.

Organization
The school is governed by a school board of seven members, elected by parents of the students for a two-year term. The school is incorporated in Guyana and operates within the laws of Guyana.

The curriculum is largely that offered by United States elementary, middle and high schools, with additions intended to assist pupils in understanding Guyana and Caribbean geography and history. Textbooks are current and are from major U.S. educational publishers. The school is fully accredited by AdvancED (Southern Association of Colleges and Schools (SACS)).

Facilities
The school is located at 9-10 Delhi Street, Prashad Nagar, Georgetown, and housed in three buildings, one of which is undergoing extensive renovation. The small campus includes classrooms a science lab, a computer lab, a school library, art and music rooms, physical education and an assembly/lunch area. There are also two play areas including an early-childhood play center.

Community work

In 2016 Georgetown International Academy's Key Club donated 11 million to Giving Hope Foundation through hosting the Childhood Cancer Awareness Walk.

See also

 Education in Guyana
 List of schools in Guyana

References

External links

1970s establishments in Guyana
1971 establishments in Guyana
American international schools in Guyana
Educational institutions established in 1971
High schools and secondary schools in Guyana
Elementary and primary schools in Guyana
Private schools in Guyana